Bertha is an unincorporated community in Wythe County, Virginia, United States.

References

Unincorporated communities in Wythe County, Virginia
Unincorporated communities in Virginia